The lesser striped shrew (Sorex bedfordiae) is a species of mammal in the family Soricidae. It is found in China, Myanmar, and Nepal.

Habitat 
In Nepal it is found in montane forests and alpine areas (above 4,000 m asl). In China it can be found at lower elevations (3,500 m asl) in the rhododendron-conifer zone. It lives in the ground litter, and forages on insects.

References

Sorex
Taxonomy articles created by Polbot
Mammals described in 1911
Taxa named by Oldfield Thomas